The Sanpoil (or San Poil) are a Native American people of the U.S. state of Washington. They are one of the Salish peoples and are one of the twelve members of the Confederated Tribes of the Colville Reservation.

The name Sanpoil comes from the Okanagan [snpʕwílx], "gray as far as one can see". It has been folk-etymologized as coming from the French sans poil, "without fur". The Yakama people know the tribe as Hai-ai'-nlma or Ipoilq. The Sanpoil call themselves Nesilextcl'n, .n.selixtcl'n, probably meaning "Salish speaking," and N'pooh-le, a shortened form of the name. The Sanpoil had a semi-democratic system of government with various chiefs representing each community within the tribe. Heredity was not a requirement for chiefs.  In later years, United States government officials began recognizing one chief at a time.

The last four officially recognized chiefs of the San Poil Tribe were Que Que Tas (b. 1822-d.1905), his son Nespelem George (b. 1863-d. Jan. 29, 1929), Skolaskin, and Jim James. The mother of Que Que Tas was a woman chief who met Lewis and Clark on the great plateau when they came through on the Pacific Northwest Expedition.

Ethnography
Since the 17th century the Sanpoil flourished with a large number of villages along the Sanpoil River and Nespelem River, tributaries of the Columbia River Later, the tribe was placed on Sanpoil and Colville Reservations in Washington state.
The San Poil Tribe was incorporated into the Colville Confederation by Executive Order from the President of the United States after strong recommendation from the Indian agents noting the San Poil's relatively peaceful nature toward others (especially European settlers).

The Sanpoil are considered Interior Salish Native Americans, a designation that also includes the Okanagan, Sinixt, Lakes, Wenatchee, Nespelem, Spokan, Kalispel, Pend d'Oreilles, Coeur d'Alene, and Flathead peoples.

Ross classifies Nespelem as one of the Okanagan tribes, while Winans classifies them as part of the Sanpoil. There is little cultural and linguistic difference between the San Poil and the Nespelem.

In 1905, the United States Indian Office counted 324 Sanpoil and 41 Nespelem.  In 1910, the Census counted 240 and 46.  In 1913, after a survey, the Office of Indian Affairs counted 202 and 43.

Language
Sanpoil is a Salish language belonging to the inland division of Salishan languages typical of Plateau nations, and related most closely to Salishan languages' eastern section.

Contemporary Language Issues 

Nesilextcl'n, the dialect of Salish spoken by the San Poil, is no longer taught in schools or spoken by the younger generations.  While a few fluent speakers remain, all are senior citizens.  Without language preservation efforts, the dialect will be lost to the San Poil people and to the world.

Legends and stories
 Chipmunk and meadowlark- Sanpoil legend about two children attacked by a monster
 Coyote becomes chief of the salmon- Sanpoil legend about the adventures of coyote.
 Coyote's salmon- Coyote teaches the Sanpoil to harvest salmon.
 Five wolves- Sanpoil story about a boy who turned into a chickadee
 How the cold lost its power- Sanpoil story about the origin of the seasons
 Origin of different languages- Sanpoil story about a quarrel between tribes
 Rolling stone- Sanpoil story about coyote getting in trouble with a grasshopper family
 Tick and the deer- Sanpoil story about the origin of the wood tick.
 Woodpecker and the theft of fire- Sanpoil legend about the origin of fire

List of Sanpoil villages
 Hahsulauk, home of the Shahsulauhuwa, near Plum.
 Kakamkam, on the islands in the Sanpoil River a short distance above the mouth.
 Kathlpuspusten, home of the Kathlpuspustenak, about a mile above Plum, on the opposite side of the river.
 Ketapkunulak, on the banks of the Columbia just east of the Sanpoil River.
 Naak, home of the Snaakau, about a mile below Plum but on the north side of the river.
 Nhohogus, fishing grounds of the S-hulalstu.
 Npuiluk, home of the Snpuiluk, at the mouth of Sanpoil River, made up of the following camps:
 Snkethlkukwiliskanan, near the present landing of the Keller ferry;
 a branch of the last called by the same name, several hundred yards north of the first between the cliff and the Sanpoil River, on the west side;
 Kethltselchin, on the first bench above the Columbia, west of the Sanpoil River.
 Nthlahoitk, a winter camp of the Snpuiluk, about halfway between Skthlamchin and Naak.
 Saamthlk, home of the Saamthlk, on the opposite side of the river from Kathlpuspusten.
 Skekwilk, on the west side of Sanpoil River about a mile above the mouth.
 Tkukualkuhun, home of the Stkukualkuhunak, at Rodger's Bar just across the river from Hunters.
 Tsaktsikskin, a winter camp of the Snpuiluk, about a half mile below Naak. Wathlwathlaskin, home of the Swathlwathlaskink,  up the river from Nthlahoitk.

Notes

Further reading

 Ray, Verne Frederick. Sanpoil Folk Tales. 1933.
 Ray, Verne F. The Sanpoil and Nespelem: Salishan Peoples of Northeastern Washington, by Verne F. Ray. Seattle, Washington: Univ. of Wash. Press, 1932.
 Watson, Ralph W. Appraisal of the Tribal Lands of the Colville Tribe, the San Poil and Nespelem Tribes, the Lakes, the Okanogans, and the Methows As Defined in the Decision of the Indian Claims Commission, Docket 181 on February 29, 1956 : All of Said Lands Being in the State of Washington and the Appraisal Being As of July 2, 1872. Library of American Indian affairs. New York: Clearwater, 1900.

External links
 Sanpoil Indian Tribe
 Sanpoil vision quest

Native American tribes in Washington (state)
Interior Salish